Linda Cassell (born 24 April 1962) is an Australian former professional tennis player.

Cassell was trained in Canberra at the Australian Institute of Sport but grew up in Brisbane, where she attended Lourdes Hill College. She was a girls' doubles champion at the 1979 Australian Open (with Susan Leo).

In 1980 she had her best Australian Open performance, reaching the women's singles second round and doubles quarter-finals. The following year she won two singles qualifying matches at Wimbledon, before falling in the final round.

Cassell is now a Catholic nun, having joined the Sisters of the Good Samaritan in 2007. She made her perpetual profession in St Scholastica' College chapel at Glebe Point, Sydney. Cassell attended Lourdes Hill College in Brisbane, a secondary school established in 1916 by the Sisters of the Good Samaritan. She has worked as a counsellor at Bede Polding College, Windsor, in Sydney's outer western suburbs and served on the Board of Directors of Stella Maris College, Manly in Sydney.

References

External links
 
 

1962 births
Living people
Australian female tennis players
Australian Open (tennis) junior champions
21st-century Australian Roman Catholic nuns
Grand Slam (tennis) champions in girls' doubles
Tennis players from Brisbane
Australian Institute of Sport tennis players